Nitten may refer to:

 Nitten, the colloquial name for the town of Newtongrange, Midlothian, Scotland
 Nitten, the shortened name for Japan Fine Arts Exhibition
 "Nitten", a 2009 song by Danish singer Thomas Holm